Ajaigarh or Ajaygarh is a town and a nagar panchayat in the Panna District of Madhya Pradesh state in central India.

Ajaigarh State was one of the princely states of India during the period of the British Raj. The state was founded in 1785, and its capital was in Ajaigarh.

History

Ajaigarh was the capital of a princely state of the same name during the British Raj. Ajaigarh was founded in 1765 by Guman Singh, a Bundela Rajput who was the nephew of Raja Pahar Singh of Jaitpur. After Ajaigarh was captured by the British in 1809, it became a princely state in the Bundelkhand Agency of the Central India Agency. The rulers bore the title of sawai maharaja. He commanded an estimated annual revenue of about £15,000/-, and paid a tribute of £460/-. The chief resided at the town of Nowgong, at the foot of the hill-fortress of Ajaigarh, from which the state took its name. The town was often afflicted by malaria, and suffered severely from famine in 1868–69 and 1896–97.

The state acceded to the Government of India on 1 January 1950; the ruling chief was granted a privy purse of Rs. 74,700/-, and the courtesy use of his styles and titles. All of these were revoked by the government of India in 1971, at the time when these privileges were revoked from all erstwhile princes. The former princely state became part of the new Indian state of Vindhya Pradesh, and most of the territory of the former state, including the town of Ajaigarh, became part of Panna District, with a smaller portion going to Chhatarpur District. Vindhya Pradesh was merged into Madhya Pradesh on 1 November 1956.

Rulers of Ajaygarh

                   Maharajadhiraja Chhatrasal    : 1649–1731
                (founder ruler of many kingdoms)
     ___|__
 Hirdeshah                   Jagatraj                   Bhartichandra
  (Panna)                    (Jaitpur)                     (Jaso)
    |__
 Vir Singh                   Kirat Singh                  Pahar Singh (1758–1765)
    |__
 Khuman Singh           Guman Singh (1765–1792)             Durg Singh
 (Charkari)               (Banda)(No issues)                   |
                                |__Son of__|
                            Bhakhat Singh         :b. 1792-d. 1837
                      (Founder ruler of Ajaigarh)
   _|___
                         Madho Singh (r. 1837–1849)   Mahipat Singh (r. 1849–1853)
                           (No male issue)                     |
                                                               |
                         Ranjore Singh (K.C.I.E)__Vijay Singh (R. 1853–1855)
                           (born 1844; died 1919)         (died early, fell from horse)                                                                                             
   _|                                                                                                                                                      
 Jaipal Singh           Bhopal Singh (K.C.I.E.)           Pakshpal Singh 
                        (born 1866; died 1942)                  | 
                                |                        Col. Deshpal Singh : (1914 -     )   
                        Punyapratap Singh:                      |                    |
                      (born 1884; died 1958)           Ajaiveer Singh        Ashit Varn Singh (1953-2017)
                                |                      (No Male Issue)               |
                      Devendra Vijay Singh                                           |
                      (born 1913; died 1984)              Hraday Shah ---------------|         
                 (Privy Purses, titles abolished)                                 
   _|_           
 Mahipendra Singh      Kaushalendra Singh            Surendra Singh       
     |               (born 1934; died 1982)                 |
     |                          |                           |   
 Shailendra Singh         Ajayraj Singh              Tarunendra Singh

Ajaigarh Fort 
Ajaigarh or Ajaygarh Fort is among the top attractions of the region. It stands alone on a hilltop in the district of Panna and is easily accessible from Khajuraho. The fort is bordered by the Vindhya Hills and provides views of the Ken River. This fort is noted for its rich historical past and its architecture, which dates to the Chandela dynasty.

The fort is visited by both history and art lovers. This fort has two gates (earlier there were five), two temples and two rock-cut tanks, close to the northern gate. These tanks have been named as Ganga and Yamuna.

Gallery

Demographics
As of the 2001 India census, Ajaigarh had a population of 13,979. Males constitute 53% of the population and females 47%. Ajaigarh has an average literacy rate of 59%, which is lower than the national average of 59.5%; with 61% of the males and 39% of females literate. 16% of the population is under 6 years of age.

References

External links

Ajaigarh photo callery
Ajaigarh Fort & Valley

Populated places established in 1765
Bundelkhand
Cities and towns in Panna district
Tourist attractions in Panna district